Henry J. Schultz was an American politician who served as mayor of Easton, Pennsylvania from 1976 to 1980.

Early life
Schultz was born on January 8, 1910, in Easton, Pennsylvania. His Father, Henry C. Schultz, was the city's former Postmaster from 1934 to 1954. He attended Easton High School, graduating in 1927. He attended Lafayette College, but graduated from Carnegie Mellon University as part of their class of 1932 with a Bachelor of Science in building construction. He worked for his fathers roofing and sheet metal company until the start of World War II when he volunteered for the Navy. He took part in the Battle of Iwo Jima and the allied occupation of Shanghai.

Political career

Easton councilor and mayor
Schultz's political career started when he was elected to Easton's first Charter Study Commission. At the same time he served on the City of Easton Authority by appointment of Mayor George Smith. He was elected to Easton City Council in November 1965, winning re-election in 1969 and 1973, serving as president of the council from 1974 to 1976. In 1976 he would defeat incumbent two term mayor Fred Ashton and serve a four-year term, before being stunningly defeated during his re-election by Republican Phil Mitman. This is still considered to be one of the most shocking upsets in Lehigh Valley political history.

Post-mayoral career
Following his defeat in the 1980 mayoral campaign he remained a local small business advocate as he was before getting into politics. He also served 20 years as a tipstaff for Northampton County President Judge Robert A. Freedberg, retiring in 2001.

Personal life
In college he joined Phi Kappa Theta and would be a lifetime member. He was also a member of the Veterans of Foreign Wars and the Knights of Columbus. He married H. Josephine Schmid on October 27, 1934, and had two children; a son John and a daughter Anne Marie. He died peacefully in his sleep June 17, 2008, aged 98. He is buried in St. Joseph Cemetery.

References

1910 births
2008 deaths
Easton Area High School alumni
Mayors of Easton, Pennsylvania